Salora Oy was a Finnish electronics manufacturer based in Salo, established in 1928 and acquired by Nokia in 1989. Its main products were radios, televisions and other home electronics. The brand name is now owned by the Dutch company Salora International BV.

History 
The company was founded as Nordell & Koskinen in 1928 by F.A. Nordell and Lauri Koskinen. In 1937, the company introduced its first product under the brand name Salora (from a combination of the words Salo and radio), and in 1945, the company changed its name to Salora Oy.

Products

Home electronics

In 1953, Salora released its first FM-radios.

In 1957, Salora started to produce B/W televisions, and in 1966 the development of color televisions was established. The first color television model, Salora Finlandia, was released in 1968 and awarded with a gold medal at the Nuremberg International Inventors' fair in 1969. The sales far exceeded the expectations with about 150 000 units sold until 1974. In the early 1970s, around 1,000 televisions of various models were produced per day by around 2,000 employees.

In 1966, Salora entered the export market by selling its televisions to costumers in Sweden. By the end of the 1970s, around 60% of the production was destined for export.

In 1967, Salora started to make HIFI-systems. The first model was called Salora Metropol 5.

Radiotelephones
In the early 1960s, Salora started to manufacture radiotelephones for the military, police and emergency services. This was later accompanied by the manufacturing of car phones compatible with the ARP-network that was launched in 1971.

Co-operation with Nokia 
In 1979, Salora and Nokia established the joint venture company "Mobira Oy" (Mobile radio), which produced mobile phones compatible with the then new NMT-network. Mobira Oy was then acquired by Nokia in 1982, and the company was later renamed to "Nokia-Mobira Oy".

In 1989, Salora was acquired by Nokia and its business was taken over by Nokia-Mobira Oy.

See also
 Finlux

References

External links 
 Elias – Electronics from Salo

Electronics companies of Finland
Defunct companies of Finland
Manufacturing companies of Finland
Salo, Finland
Electronics companies established in 1928
Companies disestablished in 1995
1928 establishments in Finland
1990s disestablishments in Finland
Finnish brands
Radio manufacturers